III Army Corps was a corps level formation of the German Army during World War II.

III Army Corps
The III Corps was formed in October 1934 as III. Armeekorps. The corps took part in Fall Weiss, the 1939 invasion of Poland as a part of Army Group North.
It then took part in Fall Gelb as a part of Army Group A, participating in the assault through the Ardennes. In March 1941, the corps was upgraded to a motorised corps status and redesignated III Armeekorps (mot). The Corps was attached to Army Group South for Operation Barbarossa, the invasion of the Soviet Union. The corps advanced through Ukraine and took part in the Battle of Brody, Battle of Kiev, Battle of Rostov, Battle of Kharkov and Battle of Uman.

III Panzer Corps
III Panzer Corps was formed in June 1942 from III Army Corps and attached to Army Group A, the formation tasked with capturing the Caucasus as a part of Fall Blau. 

In mid-1943, following the loss of the 6th Army at the Battle of Stalingrad, III Panzer Corps took part in the battles around Kharkov as part of Army Group Don. During Operation Citadel, the Corps was the striking force of Army Detachment Kempf as they attempted to protect the right flank of the 4th Panzer Army. It also took part in Operation Roland, and was involved in the retreat from Belgorod to the Dniepr.

At the beginning of 1944, the Corps participated in the relief of the forces trapped in the Korsun-Cherkassy Pocket. In March the Corps was encircled in the Kamenets-Podolsky pocket, along with the rest of the 1st Panzer Army. III Corps drove the breakout and escape. Due to heavy losses, from November 1944 to January 1945, the corps was redesignated as Gruppe Breith, after its commander General der Panzertruppe Hermann Breith.

In late 1944, III Panzerkorps participated in Operation Konrad, the failed attempts to relieve the German and Hungarian garrison at Budapest. The corps then took part in Operation Spring Awakening in Hungary. After its failure, the corps retreated through Austria, surrendering to the U.S. Army on 8 May 1945.

Commanders
Generaloberst Curt Haase   (1 Sep 1939 - 13 Nov 1940)
General der Infanterie Kurt von Greiff   (13 Nov 1940 - 15 Jan 1941)
Generaloberst Eberhard von Mackensen   (15 Jan 1941 - 31 Mar 1942)
General der Panzertruppe Leo Freiherr Geyr von Schweppenburg   (31 Mar 1942 - 20 July 1942)
Generaloberst Eberhard von Mackensen   (20 July 1942 - 2 Jan 1943)
General der Panzertruppe Hermann Breith   (2 Jan 1943 - 20 Oct 1943)
General der Artillerie Heinz Ziegler   (20 Oct 1943 - 25 Nov 1943)
General der Infanterie Friedrich Schulz   (25 Nov 1943 - 9 Jan 1944)
General der Panzertruppe Hermann Breith   (9 Jan 1944 - 31 May 1944)
General der Panzertruppe Dietrich von Saucken   (31 May 1944 - 29 June 1944)
General der Panzertruppe Hermann Breith   (29 June 1944 - 8 May 1945)

Orders Of Battle

III.Armeekorps, May 1940 - Fall Gelb

Stab der Korps
Arko 3
Korps-Nachrichten-Abteilung 43
Korps-Nachschubtruppen 403
Feldgendarmerie-Trupp 403
3. Infanterie Division
23. Infanterie Division
52. Infanterie Division

III.Armeekorps (mot), September 1941 - Operation Barbarossa
Stab der Korps
Arko 3
Korps-Nachrichten-Abteilung 43
Korps-Nachschubtruppen 403
Feldgendarmerie-Trupp 403
14.Panzer Division
60.Infanterie Division (mot)
13.Panzer Division
SS-Division Wiking
198.Infanterie Division

III.Panzerkorps, July 1943 - Operation Citadel
 Corps Troops (Stab der Korps)
 Artillery Commander 3 (Arko 3)
 43rd Panzer Signal Battalion
 Korps-Nachrichten-Abteilung 43
 Korps-Nachschubtruppen 403
 Feldgendarmerie-Trupp 403
 Corps attached units
 Sturmgeschütz-Abteilung 228
 Sturmgeschütz-Abteilung 905
 Sturmgeschütz-Batterie 393
 schwere-Panzer-Abteilung 503
 6.Panzer-Division under Major General Walther von Hünersdorff
 11.Panzer-Regiment (with 86 tanks)
 4.Panzergrenadier-Regiment
 114.Panzergrenadier-Regiment
 76.Panzerartillerie-Regiment
 7.Panzer-Division under Lieutenant General Hans Freiherr von Funck
 25.Panzer-Regiment (with 87 tanks)
 6.Panzergrenadier-Regiment
 7.Panzergrenadier-Regiment
 78.Panzerartillerie-Regiment
 19.Panzer-Division under Lieutenant General Gustav Schmidt
 27.Panzer-Regiment (with 70 tanks)
 73.Panzergrenadier-Regiment
 74.Panzergrenadier-Regiment
 19.Panzerartillerie-Regiment
 168.Infanterie-Division under Major General Walter Chales de Beaulieu
 417.Infanterie-Regiment
 429.Infanterie-Regiment
 442.Infanterie-Regiment
 248.Artillerie-Regiment

III Panzerkorps, March 1944 - Korsun-Cherkassy Pocket
Stab der Korps
Arko 3
Korps-Nachrichten-Abteilung 43
Korps-Nachschubtruppen 403
Feldgendarmerie-Trupp 403
1.Panzer Division
16.Panzer Division
17.Panzer Division
1.SS Panzer Division Leibstandate SS Adolf Hitler
schwere Panzer Abteilung 503

|II Panzerkorps, March 1945 - Operation Spring Awakening
Stab der Korps
Arko 3
Korps-Nachrichten-Abteilung 43
Korps-Nachschubtruppen 403
Feldgendarmerie-Trupp 403
schwere-Panzer-Abteilung 509
3.Panzer Division
1.Panzer Division
23.Panzer Division

See also
 Panzer, Panzer Division
 Corps, Military unit
 Wehrmacht, List of German military units of World War II

External links

Army,03
Panzer corps of Germany in World War II
Military units and formations established in 1934
1934 establishments in Germany
Military units and formations disestablished in 1945